Hollywood Wrestling, also known as Wrestling From Hollywood, was an American professional wrestling television series which originally aired locally in Los Angeles on KTLA in the early 1950s, and by 1952 nationally (via kinescope) on the improvised Paramount Television Network. It was produced by Klaus Landsberg. It was also the first professional wrestling television series to broadcast on national television.

History
Pioneer television station KTLA broadcast pro wrestling matches as early as 1947, when the station began airing televised wrestling from the Grand Olympic Auditorium. Originally, the bouts were sponsored by the Ford Motor Company.

By 1952, the matches were being syndicated nationally on the Paramount Television Network. The series was filmed (via kinescope) and then delivered to stations in the network. Hollywood Wrestling was a popular series, and although it was not seen in all areas of the United States, it did air on the following stations:

 WLEV-TV, Allentown, PA 
 KFDA-TV, Amarillo, TX 
 WBAL-TV, Baltimore, MD
 WAAM-TV, Baltimore 
 KGBT-TV, Brownsville, TX 
 WWTV, Cadillac, MI 
 KCRG-TV, Cedar Rapids, IA 
 WBTV, Charlotte, NC 
 WJW-TV, Cleveland 
 WFAA, Dallas  
 WOC-TV, Davenport, IA  
 WHIO-TV, Dayton  
 KBTV, Denver  
 KFEL-TV, Denver  
 WEAU-TV, Eau Claire, WI  
 WDAY-TV, Fargo, ND  
 WOOD-TV, Grand Rapids, MI  
 KPRC-TV, Houston  
 KID-TV, Idaho Falls, ID  
 WFBM-TV, Indianapolis  
 WJTV, Jackson, MS  
 WGAL, Lancaster, PA  
 KSWO-TV, Lawton, OK  
 WLVA-TV, Lynchburg, VA  
 KEYD-TV, Minneapolis  
 KNOE-TV, Monroe, LA  
 KPTV, Portland, OR  
 KZTV, Reno  
 KEMO, St. Louis 
 KSTP-TV, St. Paul  
 KEYL, San Antonio  
 KGO-TV, San Francisco  
 KTVW, Seattle  
 KELO-TV, Sioux Falls, SD  
 KMO-TV, Tacoma  
 WEAT-TV, West Palm Beach, FL  
 WSBA-TV, York, PA

References

External links
List of DuMont and Paramount Television wrestling shows at UCLA Film and Television Archive on Internet Archive blog

American professional wrestling television series
1952 American television series debuts
1955 American television series endings
First-run syndicated television programs in the United States
Black-and-white American television shows
Television series by CBS Studios